The albums discography of American country music artist Charley Pride contains 44 studio albums, three live albums, seven video albums, 36 compilation albums, three extended plays and 12 album appearances. Signing his first recording contract in 1966 with RCA Victor, he released his first album the same year called Country Charley Pride. The studio release peaked at number 16 on the Billboard country albums chart. It also sold 500,000 copies in the United States, helping it to receive a gold certification from the Recording Industry Association of America. In 1968, The Country Way (Pride's third album) topped the country albums chart and spent 42 weeks on the list. The record also certified gold. Pride continued releasing a series of studio albums in the 1960s. Both of his 1969 studio efforts would certify gold from the RIAA as well. 

In the early 1970s, several of his studio albums reached the number one position on the Billboard country chart: Just Plain Charley (1970), Charley Pride's 10th Album (1970), I'm Just Me (1971), Charley Pride Sings Heart Songs (1971), A Sunshiny Day with Charley Pride (1971), Songs of Love by Charley Pride (1972) and Amazing Love (1973). These releases also charted the Billboard 200 survey. Charley Pride Sings Heart Songs was his most successful, climbing to number 38. Pride's first studio record of gospel music was issued around the same time called, Did You Think to Pray. Additionally, his first live album was also released during this period called In Person. Pride's album output grew smaller as the decade progressed, with only one or two LP released per year by 1979. These albums remained successful and reached top ten positions on the country albums chart, including The Happiness of Having You (1975), Someone Loves You Honey (1978) and Burgers and Fries (1978).

In 1980, Pride's tribute album to Hank Williams reached number one on the country albums list and spent 52 weeks charting. His 1983 album of covers tunes reached number 36 on the same survey. Disappointed with record sales, Pride left RCA in 1986 and signed with 16th Avenue Records. His first studio release with the label reached number 18 on the country chart in 1987. He released his final charting album in 1989. Pride continued recording in the 1990s after signing with Honest Entertainment. In 1996, he released an album of old and new material on the label called My 6 Latest and 6 Greatest. He continued releasing new studio material until 2018 when his final album Music in My Heart was released.

Studio albums

1960s

1970s

1980s

1990s–2010s

Compilation albums

1970s

1980s

1990s

2000s–2020s

Live albums

Extended plays

Video albums

Other album appearances

References

External links
 Charley Pride music at his official website

Charley Pride albums
Country music discographies
Discographies of American artists